Palace Green is an area of grass in the centre of Durham, England, flanked by Durham Cathedral and Durham Castle.  The Cathedral and Castle together form a UNESCO World Heritage Site.

Although initially not part of the site itself, Palace Green was added to the UNESCO site in 2008.

It is situated on top of the narrow, high peninsula formed by a sharp bend in the River Wear. The Cathedral is on the southern side, facing the Castle across the Green on the north side. To the east are Durham University buildings including the law, theology, classics and history departments, with the music department and the university's special collections library to the west.

From the north and east Palace Green is accessed by two cobbled streets called Owengate (formerly Queen's Street) and Dun Cow Lane, the latter taking its name from a local legend involving a milkmaid and her cow. From the west a passageway, 'Windy Gap', leads down to the banks of the River Wear between two buildings which are now part of the university Music School. Early in the twentieth century one of the buildings had been the home of the novelist J. Meade Falkner, author of Moonfleet.

In summer, Palace Green is sometimes used by students of Durham University as a croquet lawn on permission from the groundsman of University College Durham.

'Palace Green' is also the name of a hymn tune written by Michael Fleming (1928-2006) while a music student at the university, for the hymn 'Sing Praise to God Who Reigns Above'.

During the COVID-19 Pandemic, marquees on Palace Green were used as a testing centre run by the University.

Buildings situated on Palace Green
Listed clockwise from south:
 Durham Cathedral – grade I.
 Durham University Department of Music (formerly grammar school) - grade II*.
 Durham University Department of Music library – grade II.
 Palace Green Library (original Durham University library, now houses special collections, exhibitions and a café) – grade II.
 Cosin's Library – grade II*.
 15th century Exchequer Building (now part of university library) – grade I.
 Durham Castle (home of University College) – grade I.
 University College master's house – grade II.
 Moneyer's Garth (university stone masons yard).
 Bailey Court (University College accommodation).
 Cosin's Hall (Former college, now the university's Institute of Advanced Study) – grade II*.
 Bishop Cosin's Almshouses (until 2020 a café) – grade II.
 The Pemberton Rooms (the Durham Union Society) – grade II.
 Abbey House, Durham University Department of Theology and Religion – grade II.

References
Margot Johnson. "Palace Green" in Durham: Historic and University City and surrounding area. Sixth Edition. Turnstone Ventures. 1992. . Page 4.

External links

 Durham Cathedral Website
 Durham University Croquet Club
 Palace Green Library

Durham, England
Parks and open spaces in County Durham